Adult Contemporary is a chart published by Billboard ranking the top-performing songs in the United States in the adult contemporary music (AC) market.  In 1998, eight different songs topped the chart in 52 issues of the magazine, based on weekly airplay data from radio stations compiled by Nielsen Broadcast Data Systems.

In the year's first issue of Billboard the number one song was "Something About the Way You Look Tonight" by British singer Elton John, which was in its seventh week at number one.  The song would go on to extend its unbroken run in the top spot to ten weeks before it was displaced by "My Heart Will Go On" by Canadian vocalist Celine Dion in the issue dated January 31.  Dion's song, taken from the soundtrack of the film Titanic, also spent ten weeks at number one.  It dominated radio airplay across a number of formats, even acquiring enough spins on Latin music stations to become the first non-Spanish language song to top the Hot Latin Tracks chart.  It also won a range of awards, including the Academy Award for Best Original Song and the Golden Globe Award for Best Original Song as well as the Grammy Awards for Record of the Year, Song of the Year, Best Female Pop Vocal Performance and Best Song Written Specifically for a Motion Picture or Television.  Dion would return to the top spot later in the year with both "To Love You More" and "I'm Your Angel", the latter a duet with American artist R. Kelly.  Her 21 weeks spent at number one during 1998 was the most by any artist.

The only artist other than Dion to achieve more than one AC number one in 1998 was fellow Canadian vocalist Shania Twain, who spent eight non-consecutive weeks in the top spot with "You're Still the One" and one week with "From This Moment On".  The former song also topped Billboards Hot Country Singles & Tracks chart, on which Twain had experienced considerable success since 1995, but it was her first entry on the AC listing, as her music began to be marketed toward pop audiences for the first time.  Her second number one of the year, "From This Moment On", had originally been recorded as a duet with country singer Bryan White, but his vocals were removed from the version released as a single, in order to make it more appealing to pop music radio.  The longest unbroken run at number one on the AC chart during the year was 11 weeks, achieved by Australian duo Savage Garden with the song "Truly Madly Deeply".  The track would prove to be one of the most enduring songs in the history of AC radio, and set a new record for the highest total number of weeks spent on Billboards Adult Contemporary chart with a total of 123 weeks on the listing, a mark that stood only until 2002 when Savage Garden broke its own record.

Chart history

References

See also
1998 in music
List of artists who reached number one on the U.S. Adult Contemporary chart

1998
1998 record charts
1998 in American music